Jüri Mõis (born 25 October 1956 in Pärnu) is an Estonian politician and businessman, who was mayor of Tallinn between November 1999 and June 2001, and who was the Minister of the Interior between 25 March and 5 November 1999. He is one of the three founders of Hansapank.

References

1956 births
Living people
Mayors of Tallinn
People from Pärnu
Ministers of the Interior of Estonia
20th-century Estonian politicians
21st-century Estonian politicians
Members of the Riigikogu, 1999–2003